Gonçalo Oliveira and Andrei Vasilevski were the defending champions but chose not to defend their title.

Francisco Comesaña and Luciano Darderi won the title after defeating Matteo Gigante and Francesco Passaro 6–3, 7–6(7–4) in the final.

Seeds

Draw

References

External links
 Main draw

Internazionali di Tennis Città di Vicenza - Doubles
2022 Doubles